Kopar Road is a town in neighbourhood in Dombivili. It is connected with the Mumbai Metropolitan Region by the Mumbai Suburban Railway. It is served by Kopar railway station on the Central Line.

Neighbourhoods in Mumbai